Aglaspoides is an extinct genus of aglaspid arthropod.

External links
 Aglaspoides at the Paleobiology Database

Aglaspidida